Godongsan is a mountain in Gyeonggi-do, South Korea. Its area extends across Gapyeong County and Yangpyeong County.

See also
 List of mountains in Korea

Notes

References
 

Mountains of South Korea
Mountains of Gyeonggi Province